Women's 400m races for wheelchair athletes at the 2004 Summer Paralympics were held in the Athens Olympic Stadium. Events were held in three disability classes.

T52

The T52 event consisted of 2 heats and a final. It was won by Lisa Franks, representing .

1st Round

Heat 1
23 Sept. 2004, 19:35

Heat 2
23 Sept. 2004, 19:42

Final Round
24 Sept. 2004, 21:35

T53

The T53 event consisted of 2 heats and a final. It was won by Tanni Grey-Thompson OBE, representing .

1st Round

Heat 1
25 Sept. 2004, 18:00

Heat 2
25 Sept. 2004, 18:07

Final Round
27 Sept. 2004, 10:50

T54

The T54 event consisted of 3 heats and a final. It was won by Chantal Petitclerc, representing 

Heat 1

Heat 2

Heat 3

Final Round

References

W
2004 in women's athletics